The 2006 Pennsylvania gubernatorial election was held on November 7, 2006 and included the races for the Governor of Pennsylvania and Lieutenant Governor of Pennsylvania. Incumbent Democratic Governor Ed Rendell successfully ran for re-election. Pennsylvania's first female lieutenant governor, Catherine Baker Knoll, was also running for re-election. 

As of 2022, this is the most recent gubernatorial election in which the Democratic candidate has carried the following counties- Clearfield, Columbia, Elk, Mercer, Pike, Susquehanna, Warren, Washington, Wayne and Wyoming. This is the last time any statewide race in Pennsylvania resulted in a candidate getting over 60% of the vote.

Background
Rendell and Knoll had the advantage of incumbency, important in the swing state of Pennsylvania. Rendell's approval rating as of May 2006 was 62%.

In the 2000 Presidential election, then Vice President Al Gore won the state 50.6%-46.4% over then Texas Governor George W. Bush.  In 2004, Senator John Kerry carried the state 50.9%-48.4% over incumbent President Bush.

Although the state had voted Democratic in eight of the past 12 presidential elections, its Congressional delegation had been majority Republican for years. The counties of Philadelphia and Allegheny are the Democratic strongholds (Philadelphia: 75% Democrat, Allegheny: 60% Democrat), while the central part of the state is where the Republican Party fares best. The 2005 statewide party registration had Democrats out-numbering Republicans in the state with 3,841,429 to 3,292,656, with 939,252 registered independent voters.

Democratic primary
Michael Morrill, the Green Party's nominee for governor in 2002, considered challenging Rendell on a progressive liberal platform. On February 13, 2006, Morrill however stated that he would not run, citing the toll his 2002 race took on his family. Rendell thus ran unopposed.

Results

Republican primary
Lynn Swann, Jeff Piccola, Jim Panyard and Bill Scranton III all announced their intention to run in the Republican primary for governor in 2006. Scranton, who served two terms as lieutenant governor of Pennsylvania, is the son of popular former Governor William Scranton, and a member of the wealthy and politically influential Scranton family, was the early front-runner. However, a series of blunders by his campaign, and a lack of momentum from the Piccola and Panyard campaigns moved Swann into presumptive nominee status. The state Republican party then endorsed Swann, leading the three other candidates to drop out ahead of the March deadline to file for the primary.

Candidates

Declared
 Lynn Swann, Pittsburgh Steelers Hall-of Fame wide receiver and chairman of the President's Council on Physical Fitness and Sports

Withdrew
 Jeff Piccola, Majority Whip of the Pennsylvania State Senate
 William Scranton III, former lieutenant governor and the 1986 nominee
 Jim Panyard, former president of the Pennsylvania Manufacturer's Association

Declined
 Jane Earll, State Senator and nominee for Lieutenant Governor in 2002
 Pat Toomey, Former US Representative and candidate for US Senate in 2004
 Mark Schweiker, Former Governor
 Melissa Hart, US Representative
 Rick Santorum, US Senator
 Bruce Castor, District Attorney of Montgomery County and candidate for Attorney General in 2004

Results

General Election

Candidates
Four candidates were campaigning for governor, but only two went on to appear on the ballot in November. Rendell and Swann both were unopposed for their respective major party nominations. Constitution candidate Hagan Smith and Independent candidate Russ Diamond were unable to secure the necessary signatures to appear on the ballot. On August 11, Green Party candidate Marakay Rogers withdrew her nominating papers, following a challenge by Pennsylvania Democrats, who alleged more than 69,000 signatures on the petitions were fake names, unregistered voters or illegible.
The challenge followed Republican Senator Rick Santorum's drive to collect signatures to put Green candidate Carl Romanelli on the ballot.

Rogers continued to campaign, hopeful that a federal appeals court would rule favorably in a lawsuit seeking to overturn the state's signature requirement for third party candidates.

 Democrat: Ed Rendell—incumbent Governor of Pennsylvania. Previously, he was the chairman of the Democratic National Committee and Mayor of Philadelphia.
 Republican: Lynn Swann—a retired Pittsburgh Steelers football Hall of Fame wide receiver, and former chairman of the President's Council on Physical Fitness and Sports
 Green Party: Marakay Rogers (Green Party), an attorney, liberal activist, and 2004 Green Party State Attorney General nominee.
 Constitution Party: Hagan Smith (Constitution Party), a building contractor, conservative activist and chair of the Butler County Constitution Party.
 Independent: Russ Diamond (Independent), one of three people declared "people of the year" by The Philadelphia Inquirer, for his work in exposing the clandestine pay raise the General Assembly voted themselves at 2am just before adjournment in July 2005. His running mate would have been Tom Lingenfelter, a former GOP state committeeman, conservative activist, and frequent candidate.

Analysis 

Challenging Rendell was former Pittsburgh Steelers Hall of Famer, Lynn Swann (R). His running mate was businessman Jim Matthews,  Montgomery County Commissioner and the brother of MSNBC's Chris Matthews.

In July 2005, a Zogby Poll showed Rendell with only a 47% to 41% lead over Lynn Swann.  Some speculated that controversy over Act 72, proposed Medicaid cuts, and possibly even a legislative pay increase that was signed into law had reduced the Governor's popularity.  Also, when compared to other polls, the six percent lead was an outlier. Rendell has led in other recent polls by significantly higher margins.

Following that poll, Rendell's supporters pointed out that he has raised more money than his opponents, which they felt would help him spread his message. They also pointed out that no Pennsylvania governor had lost re-election since the 1950s, [until the PA Constitutional Convention of 1968, Pennsylvania governors were limited to one consecutive term—therefore a correct statement would be "no PA governor has lost a bid for re-election since 1970"] and that, as a sitting governor, Rendell had all of the traditional advantages of an incumbent.

Swann hoped to perform strongly in the conservative "T" section of the state (the central and northern regions) and in his native western Pennsylvania area. On 7 February 2006 Swann served as master of ceremonies for the Pittsburgh Steelers's Super Bowl XL victory parade before 250,000 people. Swann canvassed for votes among tailgating voters in Philadelphia before the Steelers game against the Eagles. Polls in early February showed Swann and Rendell in a statistical tie.

However, Swann's momentum did not survive an effective barrage of advertising from Rendell in early spring and had trouble keeping up with Rendell's effective fundraising. Swann's focus on "reforming" Harrisburg never caught traction, possibly as a result of his vocal support for Chip Brightbill and Robert Jubelirer, two legislative leaders who were defeated in the May 2006 primary election.

Predictions

Polling

Results

See also
2006 United States Senate election in Pennsylvania
2006 United States gubernatorial elections
2005 Pennsylvania General Assembly pay raise controversy

References

External links
Campaign websites (Archived)
Ed Rendell
Lynn Swann

Sources
 

2006
Gubernatorial
2006 United States gubernatorial elections